Mildrette Netter (born June 16, 1948 in Rosedale, Mississippi) is an American athlete who competed mainly in the 100 meters.

She competed for the United States in the 1968 Summer Olympics held in Mexico City, Mexico in the 4 x 100 meters where she won the gold medal with her teammates Barbara Ferrell, Margaret Bailes, and Wyomia Tyus. The relay Netter was a part of set the world record with a time of 42.88. Netter also competed in the 1972 Olympics.

References

 
 Mildrette Netter Graves at Mississippi Sports Hall of Fame
 

1948 births
Living people
Sportspeople from Greenville, Mississippi
Track and field athletes from Mississippi
American female sprinters
Athletes (track and field) at the 1968 Summer Olympics
Athletes (track and field) at the 1972 Summer Olympics
Olympic gold medalists for the United States in track and field
Medalists at the 1968 Summer Olympics
Olympic female sprinters
21st-century American women